Sanyang Road Station serves as an interchange station of Line 1 and Line 7 of Wuhan Metro. The elevated station entered revenue service along with the completion of Line 1, Phase 1 on July 28, 2004, and the underground station entered service on October 1, 2018 with the opening of Line 7.

Station layout

Facilities

Sanyang Road Station for Line 1 is a two-story elevated station placed along Jinghan Avenue. The station has two side platforms accommodating a pair of tracks, and is equipped with attended customer service concierges, automatic ticket vending machines, and accessible ramps. The underground Line 7 station has a two side platforms and is connected to the elevated portion with two pairs of escalators, and a connecting bridge over the Sanyang Road intersection on both sides of the Jinghan Avenue.

Exits

There are sixteen exits in service:

Exit A: Northwestern side of Jinghan Avenue.
Exit B: Southeastern side of Jinghan Avenue.
Exit C1
Exit C2
Exit D
Exit E
Exit F
Exit G
Exit H
Exit J
Exit K1
Exit K2
Exit L1
Exit L2
Exit L3
Exit L4

Transfers

Bus transfers to Route 502, 534, 559, 581, 598, 608, 622, 711 and 801 are available at Sanyang Road Station.

References

Wuhan Metro stations
Line 1, Wuhan Metro
Line 7, Wuhan Metro
Railway stations in China opened in 2004